The 1967 Singaporean presidential election was held to elect the next president of Singapore. Yusof Ishak was elected by the Parliament of Singapore. 

This was the first presidential election held in Singapore since the country's independence in 1965. Under the Singaporean constitution at the time, the president was elected by the Parliament of Singapore.

Results
The election took place during a sitting of the Parliament on 30 November 1967.

On that day's sitting, 47 out of the 51 members of Parliament were present, and four members were absent.

Prime Minister Lee Kuan Yew nominated Yusof Ishak as president during the sitting. The Parliament voted unanimously to elect Ishak as president.

Ishak was sworn in for his second term as president on 4 December 1967.

References 

Presidential elections in Singapore
Singapore
Presidential election